Roger Hoffman is an American composer and singer.  His most noted work is "Consider the Lilies" which was featured on a Mormon Tabernacle Choir CD with the same name.

Hoffman and his wife Melanie have collaborated in many musical endeavors.  They have also worked in collaboration with Steven Kapp Perry.

Hoffman is a Latter-day Saint and has served in a ward bishopric.

Hoffman composed the music for the biographic film on Hugh Nibley, Faith of an Observer.  He also has worked with Truman G. Madsen on a project about the life and mission of Jesus Christ.

References 
 
 bio from Hoffman's website
 LDS Music World entry on Hoffman
 LDSMusicNow entry on Hoffman

American male composers
21st-century American composers
American Latter Day Saint hymnwriters
Living people
21st-century American male musicians
Year of birth missing (living people)